Paradise Peak, at  above sea level is a peak in the Smoky Mountains of Idaho. The peak is located in Sawtooth National Forest in Camas County. It is located in the watersheds of Paradise and Emma creeks and the South Fork of the Boise River. No roads or trails go to the summit.

References 

Mountains of Idaho
Mountains of Camas County, Idaho
Sawtooth National Forest